"I'm Gonna Do All I Can (To Do Right By My Man)" is a song written by Wayne Carson. It was released by R&B duo Ike & Tina Turner on Minit Records in 1969.

Recording and release 
"I'm Gonna Do All I Can (To Do Right By My Man)" was recorded in January 1969 and released as a non-album track on Minit Records in March 1969. It was released on Minit's parent label, Liberty Records, in the Netherlands. Ike & Tina Turner promoted the song with the Ikettes on The Smothers Brothers Comedy Hour in April 1969. The single peaked at No. 98 on the Billboard Hot 100 and No. 46 on the R&B chart. It reached No. 27 on the Cash Box R&B chart.

The B-side "You've Got Too Many Ties That Bind " was reissued on the album Airwaves in 1978.

"I'm Gonna Do All I Can (To Do Right By My Man)" was reissued on the 3-CD compilation album The Ike & Tina Turner Story: 1960–1975, released by Time Life in 2007.

Critical reception 
Billboard chose the single as a spotlight feature predicted to reach the R&B chart.

Cash Box (March 15, 1969): "Heavy ballad outing with outstanding material and a very strong belting vocal make the newest Ike & Tina Turner set a winning turntable sound that could come to life saleswise.

Track listing

Chart performance

References 

1969 songs
1969 singles
Ike & Tina Turner songs
Minit Records singles
Song recordings produced by Ike Turner
1960s ballads
Rhythm and blues ballads
Liberty Records singles
Songs written by Wayne Carson